The European Zone of qualification for the 2014 FIFA World Cup saw 53 teams competing for 13 places at the finals in Brazil. The draw for the qualification groups was held at the World Cup Preliminary Draw at the Marina da Glória in Rio de Janeiro, Brazil, on 30 July 2011.  

The qualification format was the same as 2010. The teams were drawn into eight groups of six teams and one group of five, with the nine group winners qualifying directly for the final tournament. The eight best runners-up (determined by records against the first-, third-, fourth- and fifth-placed teams in their groups to ensure equity between different groups) were drawn in two-legged play-offs that determined the remaining four qualifying nations.

The qualification process started on 7 September 2012, over two months after the end of UEFA Euro 2012, and ended on 19 November 2013. Belgium, Bosnia and Herzegovina, England, Germany, Italy, Netherlands, Russia, Spain, and Switzerland qualified in the first round by winning their groups. Croatia, France, Greece, and Portugal qualified via the second round play-offs.

Format
All 53 UEFA national teams entered qualification, aiming to secure one of the 13 European Zone slots for the 2014 FIFA World Cup. The draw for the qualification groups was held at the World Cup Preliminary Draw at the Marina da Glória in Rio de Janeiro, Brazil, on 30 July 2011. The qualification format was the same as 2010. The teams were drawn into eight groups of six teams and one group of five, with the nine group winners qualifying directly for the final tournament. The eight best runners-up (determined by records against the first-, third-, fourth- and fifth-placed teams in their groups to ensure equity between different groups) were drawn in two-legged play-offs that determined the remaining four qualifying nations.

Seeding
The July 2011 FIFA World Rankings were used to seed the teams. In consideration of the delicate political situations of the relationships between Armenia and Azerbaijan as well as relations between Russia and Georgia, UEFA requested that FIFA maintain the current UEFA policy not to draw these teams into the same qualification groups – although as Armenia and Azerbaijan were in the same pot they could not be drawn together anyway. The mechanism for keeping Russia and Georgia apart was confirmed by the FIFA Organising Committee on 29 July 2011.

Teams in bold eventually qualified for the final tournament, teams in bold italic qualified for the final tournament through the play-offs, and teams in italic participated in the play-offs but did not qualify for the final tournament.

First round

The matches were played between 7 September 2012 and 15 October 2013. An initial schedule that includes matches before this date was not ratified by FIFA. A win was awarded 3 points, a draw was awarded 1 point, and a loss 0. The team with the most points in each group secured direct qualification for the final tournament of the World Cup.

Summary

Groups

Tie-breaking criteria
If two teams had the same number of points the criteria below were used.

Group A

Group B

Group C

Group D

Group E

Group F

Group G

Group H

Group I

Second round

Group runners-up
The eight best group runners-up contested the second round, where they were paired into four two-legged (home-and-away) fixtures. The four winners qualified for the 2014 FIFA World Cup. Because one group had one team fewer than the others, matches against the last-placed team in each of the six-team groups were not included in this ranking. Teams were ranked by the following parameters in order:
 Highest number of points
 Goal difference
 Highest number of goals scored

Matches
The second round draw took place at the headquarters of FIFA in Zurich on 21 October 2013. The October 2013 FIFA World Rankings were used to decide which of the teams would be seeded (shown below in brackets).

One team from pot 1 was paired with one from pot 2 as shown below. The matches were played on 15 and 19 November 2013. Winners: Portugal, France, Greece and Croatia as shown in bold.

|}

Qualified teams
The following 13 teams from UEFA qualified for the final tournament.

1 Bold indicates champions for that year. Italic indicates hosts for that year.
2 Competed as Soviet Union.
3 Competed as West Germany. A separate team for East Germany also participated in qualifications during this time, having only competed in 1974.

Discipline
In the qualification tournament, a player would be suspended for the subsequent match in the competition for either getting red card or accumulating two yellow cards in two different matches. UEFA's Control and Disciplinary body has the ability to increase the automatic one match ban for a red card (e.g., for violent conduct). Single yellow card cautions would be erased prior to the play-off portion, and would not carry over. Single yellow cards and suspensions for yellow card accumulations do not carry over to the 2014 FIFA World Cup tournament matches. The following players were suspended during the final tournament – for one or more games – as a result of red cards or yellow card accumulations:

Goalscorers

11 goals

 Robin van Persie

10 goals

 Edin Džeko

8 goals

 Vedad Ibišević
 Mesut Özil
 Cristiano Ronaldo
 Zlatan Ibrahimović

7 goals

 Wayne Rooney

6 goals

 David Alaba
 Robbie Keane
 Eden Ben Basat
 Tomer Hemed
 Hélder Postiga

5 goals

 Zvjezdan Misimović
 Franck Ribéry
 Marco Reus
 Kostas Mitroglou
 Mario Balotelli
 Jeremain Lens
 Rafael van der Vaart
 Ciprian Marica
 Aleksandr Kerzhakov
 Milivoje Novaković
 Umut Bulut
 Burak Yılmaz
 Andriy Yarmolenko

4 goals

 Yura Movsisyan
 Kevin De Bruyne
 Mario Mandžukić
 Daniel Agger
 Frank Lampard
 Danny Welbeck
 Mario Götze
 Miroslav Klose
 Thomas Müller
 André Schürrle
 Dimitris Salpingidis
 Balázs Dzsudzsák
 Gylfi Sigurðsson
 Kolbeinn Sigþórsson
 Pablo Daniel Osvaldo
 Eugen Sidorenco
 Andrija Delibašić
 Dejan Damjanović
 Jakub Błaszczykowski
 Bruno Alves
 Aleksandr Kokorin
 Aleksandar Kolarov
 Pedro
 Marko Dević
 Gareth Bale

3 goals

 Henrikh Mkhitaryan
 Martin Harnik
 Marc Janko
 Miralem Pjanić
 Stanislav Manolev
 Aleksandar Tonev
 Nicklas Bendtner
 Jermain Defoe
 Toni Kroos
 Birkir Bjarnason
 Jóhann Berg Guðmundsson
 Jonathan Walters
 Arjen Robben
 Robert Lewandowski
 Gabriel Torje
 Viktor Fayzulin
 Roman Shirokov
 Filip Đuričić
 Martin Jakubko
 Marek Sapara
 Álvaro Negredo
 Johan Elmander
 Fabian Schär
 Yevhen Khacheridi
 Yevhen Konoplyanka
 Yevhen Seleznyov
 Roman Bezus
 Aaron Ramsey

2 goals

 Edgar Çani
 Valdet Rama
 Hamdi Salihi
 Aras Özbiliz
 Philipp Hosiner
 Andreas Ivanschitz
 Zlatko Junuzović
 Ruslan Abishov
 Christian Benteke
 Eden Hazard
 Vincent Kompany
 Romelu Lukaku
 Kevin Mirallas
 Emil Gargorov
 Ivelin Popov
 Eduardo
 Efstathios Aloneftis
 Tomáš Pekhart
 Matěj Vydra
 Morten Rasmussen
 Steven Gerrard
 Daniel Sturridge
 Alex Oxlade-Chamberlain
 Konstantin Vassiljev
 Teemu Pukki
 Karim Benzema
 Olivier Giroud
 Mamadou Sakho
 Per Mertesacker
 Theofanis Gekas
 Dániel Böde
 Zoltán Gera
 Tamás Hajnal
 Vladimir Koman
 Ádám Szalai
 Alfreð Finnbogason
 Daniele De Rossi
 Andrei Finonchenko
 Kairat Nurdauletov
 Aleksandrs Cauņa
 Edgaras Česnauskis
 Deivydas Matulevičius
 Stefano Bensi
 Daniel da Mota
 Aurélien Joachim
 Agim Ibraimi
 Michael Mifsud
 Alexandru Antoniuc
 Fatos Bećiraj
 Stevan Jovetić
 Mirko Vučinić
 Elsad Zverotić
 Klaas-Jan Huntelaar
 Bruno Martins Indi
 Ruben Schaken
 Gareth McAuley
 Martin Paterson
 Tarik Elyounoussi
 Brede Hangeland
 Joshua King
 Adrian Mierzejewski
 Łukasz Piszczek
 Piotr Zieliński
 Silvestre Varela
 Costin Lazăr
 Bogdan Stancu
 Denis Glushakov
 Aleksandr Samedov
 Robert Snodgrass
 Dušan Tadić
 Marek Hamšík
 Tim Matavž
 Jordi Alba
 Sergio Ramos
 Rasmus Elm
 Tobias Hysén
 Alexander Kačaniklić
 Mario Gavranović
 Gökhan Inler
 Stephan Lichtsteiner
 Xherdan Shaqiri
 Granit Xhaka
 Mevlüt Erdinç
 Selçuk İnan
 Artem Fedetskiy
 Roman Zozulya

1 goal

 Erjon Bogdani
 Odise Roshi
 Armando Sadiku
 Gevorg Ghazaryan
 Karlen Mkrtchyan
 Artur Sarkisov
 György Garics
 Sebastian Prödl
 Rauf Aliyev
 Rahid Amirguliyev
 Rufat Dadashov
 Vagif Javadov
 Mahir Shukurov
 Renan Bressan
 Stanislaw Drahun
 Egor Filipenko
 Timofei Kalachev
 Anton Putsila
 Dmitry Verkhovtsov
 Sergei Kornilenko
 Steven Defour
 Marouane Fellaini
 Guillaume Gillet
 Jan Vertonghen
 Ermin Bičakčić
 Izet Hajrović
 Senad Lulić
 Haris Medunjanin
 Radoslav Dimitrov
 Ivan Ivanov
 Georgi Milanov
 Dimitar Rangelov
 Vedran Ćorluka
 Nikica Jelavić
 Niko Kranjčar
 Dejan Lovren
 Ivica Olić
 Ivan Perišić
 Ivan Rakitić
 Darijo Srna
 Vincent Laban
 Constantinos Makrides
 Bořek Dočkal
 Theodor Gebre Selassie
 Daniel Kolář
 Libor Kozák
 Jan Rezek
 Tomáš Rosický
 Tomáš Hübschman
 David Lafata
 Václav Kadlec
 Leon Andreasen
 Andreas Bjelland
 Andreas Cornelius
 Simon Kjær
 William Kvist
 Nicki Bille Nielsen
 Niki Zimling
 Leighton Baines
 Rickie Lambert
 James Milner
 Andros Townsend
 Ashley Young
 Henri Anier
 Tarmo Kink
 Joel Lindpere
 Andres Oper
 Rógvi Baldvinsson
 Fróði Benjaminsen
 Arnbjørn Hansen
 Hallur Hansson
 Roman Eremenko
 Kasper Hämäläinen
 Étienne Capoue
 Abou Diaby
 Christophe Jallet
 Samir Nasri
 Paul Pogba
 Mathieu Valbuena
 Guram Kashia
 Alexander Kobakhidze
 Tornike Okriashvili
 İlkay Gündoğan
 Sami Khedira
 Lazaros Christodoulopoulos
 Giorgos Karagounis
 Sotiris Ninis
 Nikos Spyropoulos
 Roland Juhász
 Krisztián Németh
 Nemanja Nikolić
 Tamás Priskin
 Vilmos Vanczak
 Kári Árnason
 Kevin Doyle
 Andy Keogh
 Darren O'Dea
 John O'Shea
 Marc Wilson
 Rami Gershon
 Maor Melikson
 Bibras Natcho
 Maharan Radi
 Lior Refaelov
 Itay Shechter
 Eran Zahavi
 Giorgio Chiellini
 Mattia Destro
 Alessandro Florenzi
 Alberto Gilardino
 Riccardo Montolivo
 Federico Peluso
 Andrea Pirlo
 Alberto Aquilani
 Heinrich Schmidtgal
 Dmitriy Shomko
 Nauris Bulvītis
 Edgars Gauračs
 Kaspars Gorkšs
 Vladimirs Kamešs
 Renārs Rode
 Valērijs Šabala
 Māris Verpakovskis
 Artūrs Zjuzins
 Martin Büchel
 Mathias Christen
 Nicolas Hasler
 Michele Polverino
 Fiodor Cernych
 Tadas Kijanskas
 Saulius Mikoliūnas
 Darvydas Šernas
 Marius Žaliūkas
 Mathias Jänisch
 Adis Jahović
 Jovan Kostovski
 Nikolče Noveski
 Aleksandar Trajkovski
 Ivan Tričkovski
 Roderick Briffa
 Clayton Failla
 Edward Herrera
 Igor Armaș
 Serghei Dadu
 Alexandru Epureanu
 Viorel Frunză
 Artur Ioniță
 Alexandru Suvorov
 Luka Đorđević
 Nikola Drinčić
 Luciano Narsingh
 Wesley Sneijder
 Kevin Strootman
 Steven Davis
 David Healy
 Niall McGinn
 Dean Shiels
 Jamie Ward
 Daniel Braaten
 Markus Henriksen
 Tom Høgli
 John Arne Riise
 Kamil Glik
 Jakub Kosecki
 Waldemar Sobota
 Łukasz Teodorczyk
 Jakub Wawrzyniak
 Hugo Almeida
 Fábio Coentrão
 Ricardo Costa
 Nani
 Alexandru Chipciu
 Valerică Găman
 Gheorghe Grozav
 Alexandru Maxim
 Adrian Mutu
 Mihai Pintilii
 Cristian Tănase
 Claudiu Keșerü
 Vasili Berezutski
 Alessandro Della Valle
 Ikechi Anya
 Grant Hanley
 Shaun Maloney
 Kenny Miller
 James Morrison
 Steven Naismith
 Dušan Basta
 Filip Đorđević
 Branislav Ivanović
 Lazar Marković
 Aleksandar Mitrović
 Stefan Šćepović
 Miralem Sulejmani
 Zoran Tošić
 Ján Ďurica
 Viktor Pečovský
 Kornel Saláta
 Valter Birsa
 Boštjan Cesar
 Josip Iličić
 Kevin Kampl
 Andraž Kirm
 Rene Krhin
 Marko Šuler
 Juan Mata
 Roberto Soldado
 Xavi
 Marcus Berg
 Mikael Lustig
 Martin Olsson
 Anders Svensson
 Tranquillo Barnetta
 Blerim Džemaili
 Michael Lang
 Haris Seferovic
 Emre Belözoğlu
 Arda Turan
 Edmar
 Denys Harmash
 Oleh Husyev
 Vitaliy Mandzyuk
 Yaroslav Rakytskiy
 Simon Church
 Hal Robson-Kanu

1 own goal

 Ildefons Lima (playing against Hungary)
 Igor Shitov (playing against Finland)
 Ragnar Klavan (playing against Hungary)
 Pól Jóhannus Justinussen (playing against the Republic of Ireland)
 Joona Toivio (playing against France)
 Vasilis Torosidis (playing against Romania)
 Szilárd Devecseri (playing against the Netherlands)
 Dmitriy Shomko (playing against the Republic of Ireland)
 Stefan Ristovski (playing against Serbia)
 Ryan Camilleri (playing against Denmark)
 Branko Bošković (playing against England)
 Alessandro Della Valle (playing against England)
 Martin Škrtel (playing against Greece)

References

External links
Results and schedule (FIFA.com version)
Results and schedule (UEFA.com version)

 
Uefa
FIFA World Cup qualification (UEFA)
World
World